My American Dream is the sole studio album by Neal E. Boyd released on June 23, 2009. The album charted on the Billboard 200.

Background
After Boyd won the third season of America's Got Talent, he was signed to Decca Records. Boyd explained  that the name of the album reflects on how he met his dream after winning Talent. Songs included on the album are "God Bless the USA," "Ave Maria," "Amazing Grace," West Side Story's song "Somewhere," and his Talent winning song "Nessun Dorma."

The album was released on the date of the fourth season premiere of Talent, which was June 23, 2009.

Boyd has since gone on tour with Britain's Got Talent winner Paul Potts, and later sang for US President Barack Obama and Missouri Governor Matt Blunt.

Reception

Commercial performance
The album sold 6,000 copies in its first week of release. The album also debuted at #195 on the Billboard 200 and #3 on the Top Classical Albums Chart.

Critical reception
James Manheim of AllMusic said Boyd's talent "leaves an impression on listeners. That's the quality that makes for a crossover star." Stephen Thomas Erlewine called it "an effective showcase for his supple singing if not quite an artistic statement of purpose. Thankfully, Boyd avoids the ersatz Euro-schlock of Il Divo, never trying to have a pop production, instead being happily symphonic."

Track listing
 "God Bless the U.S.A."  3:57
 "Nessun dorma" 3:05
 "Mama" 3:23
 "Somewhere" 3:22
 "Il Gladiatore" 3:45
 "Bring Him Home" 3:43
 "Is Nothing Sacred" 4:12
 "Anthem" 3:08
 "Sonny Boy" 2:58
 "Ave Maria" 4:47
 "Amazing Grace" 2:36

Personnel
These are the personnel who helped create the album.

Savan Kotecha (Composer)
Winston Simone (Executive Producer)
Peter Rudge (Representation)
Neal E. Boyd (Vocals, Liner Notes)
Evelyn de Morgan (A&R)
Jeffrey Pescetto (Lyricist)
Jon Bailey (Engineer, Mixing, Digital Editing)
Justin S. Turner (Legal Counsel)
City of Prague Philharmonic Orchestra (Choir, Orchestra)

Charts

Chart positions

Sales

References

2009 debut albums
Decca Records albums

id:Tried and True